Benjamin King (born November 8, 1971) is an American actor.

Career 
King guest starred on Scrubs as Milos and appeared in episodes of Grey's Anatomy, Las Vegas, and Mike & Molly. He starred on Disney Channel TV series Liv and Maddie as Pete Rooney, father of main characters, during the show's first three seasons. His character did not appear in the final season.

Personal life
On May 29, 2004, he married Laura (née Kravitz) King. They live in Encino, California with their two daughters.

Filmography

Film

Television

References

External links 

Benjamin King at TV Guide
Benjamin King at Allmovie

1971 births
Living people
American male film actors
American male television actors
20th-century American male actors
21st-century American male actors
Male actors from Los Angeles